New York's 45th State Senate district is one of 63 districts in the New York State Senate. It has been represented by Republican Dan Stec since 2021, succeeding fellow Republican Betty Little.

Geography
District 45 covers a large swath of northeastern New York's North County and Capital District, including all of Clinton, Essex, Franklin, and Warren Counties, and parts of St. Lawrence County and Washington County. The district, which contains Plattsburgh and Queensbury, reaches the northernmost point in the state. With an area of over 6,800 square miles, it is both the largest State Senate district in New York and the largest state legislative district in the  Northeastern United States.

The district is located in New York's 21st congressional district, and overlaps with the 107th, 113th, 114th, 115th, and 118th districts of the New York State Assembly.

Recent election results

2020

2018

2016

2014

2012

Federal results in District 45

References

45